Cosmostigma is a genus of plants in the family Apocynaceae, first described as a genus in 1834. It is native to tropical and subtropical Asia.

Species
 Cosmostigma cordatum (Poir.) M.R.Almeida - India, Sri Lanka
 Cosmostigma hainanense Tsiang - Hainan Province in China
 Cosmostigma philippinense Schltr. - Philippines

References

Asclepiadoideae
Apocynaceae genera